Provincial Road 204 (PR 204) is a provincial road in the Canadian province of Manitoba. PR 204 stretches from the Province's capital, Winnipeg to Selkirk, running under the name Henderson Highway between Winnipeg and PR 202. It has a short concurrency with PTH 44 in Lockport. PR 204 is part of the La Vérendrye Trail between Winnipeg and PR 212 in East Selkirk.

Route description 
Provincial Road 204 begins just north of Winnipeg at Route 42. It moves north, crossing the Perimeter Highway. Route 204 continuously stays near the Red River, crossing several side streets and passing Hyland Park. PR 204 crosses PR 202 and enters Lockport, coming to a concurrency with PTH 44. This concurrency crosses the Red River Floodway before PR 204 continues northward and crosses other streets. The road crosses the Red River on the Selkirk Lift Bridge originally completed as a toll crossing in 1937. It then enters Selkirk along Eaton Avenue, ending at PTH 9A (Main Street).

History
PR 204 was the original route of PTH 9 between Winnipeg and Lockport. When the Provincial Secondary Highway system was implemented in 1966, PR 204's southern terminus was with Trans Provincial Highway 4 (now PTH 44) near Lockport. PR 204 was extended to Winnipeg when PTH 9 was reconfigured to the old PTH 4 in 1968.

Major intersections

References

External links 

Official Highway Map of Manitoba - Winnipeg

204